Fredrick Erik Federley (born 6 May 1978) is a former Swedish politician and Member of the European Parliament (MEP) from Sweden. He was a member of the Centre Party, part of the Alliance of Liberals and Democrats for Europe. He was a member of the Parliament of Sweden from 2006 to 2014 and MEP since 1 July 2014. On 24 September 2015 he was elected Second Vice Chairman of the Centre Party.

Federley has held several posts within the Center Party. From 2002 to 2007, he was the chairman of the youth league, Centre Party Youth (CUF). He was first elected to the parliament of Sweden in 2006, and remained a member up until 2014 (with a parental leave in between). In the 2014 European Parliament election, Federley passed the previous MEP for the Center Party Kent Johansson, in personal votes, whom he thereby replaced.

He was Vice President of the Renew Europe group in the European parliament since July 2019.
He left politics on December 11, 2020, after heavy criticism for having a relationship during 2020 with a man who was on parole for child rape.

Youth and education 
Federley was born in Munktorp in Köping Municipality, Västmanland County, but grew up in nearby Kungsör. He did his military service at Uppland Regiment (S1) in Enköping from 1997 to 1998. He later went on to study legal- and political science at Örebro University. He later moved to Jakobsberg and to work as a political editor of the newspaper .

Federley is openly gay.

Political career

Career in local politics
Federley joined the Centre Party Youth during the 1994 election, and started a local branch of the organization together with a friend. A year and a half later he became vice chairman of the Centre Party Youth Västmanland district, and the following year chairman of the district (a post he kept until October 2000). In the 1998 election he was elected a member of the municipal council in Kungsör. In the spring of 2000 he was elected vice chairman of the Centre Party Västmanland district (a post he kept until the spring of 2002). In the 2002 election he was the Centre Party candidate to receive most votes in the Västmanland County constituency, but due to the 8%-rule regarding personal votes the mandate instead went to the first name on the list. On 18 October 2002 Federley was unanimously elected new chairman of the Centre Party Youth, succeeding . He had the post until May 2007, when Magnus Andersson was elected.

Member of the Swedish Parliament, 2006–2014
In the 2006 election Federley was elected a member of the Riksdag for the Stockholm Municipality constituency, along with the actress Solveig Ternström. He was a member of the Riksdag's Committee on Social Insurance and the Swedish delegation to the Parliamentary Assembly of the Organization for Security and Co-operation in Europe (OSCE), and a substitute to the Committee on European Union Affairs. He was re-elected in the 2010 election.

First mandate in the European Parliament, 2014–2019
Federley was elected Member of the European Parliament in the elections held on 25 May 2014, defeating the incumbent Center Party MEP, Kent Johansson. In parliament, he has taken seats as ordinary member of the Committee on Industry, Research and Energy (ITRE) and Committee of inquiry into Emission Measurements in the Automotive Sector (EMIS); on ITRE, he serves as coordinator for ALDE. Federley is also a substitute member of the Committee on Agriculture and Rural Development (AGRI) and the Committee on the Environment, Public Health and Food Safety (ENVI). He is vice president for the European Parliament's delegation to the Pan-African Parliament.

On 1 September 2015 Federley announced that he was running for President of the ALDE Party. He later stepped down to candidate as vice president along with the presidential candidate Siim Kallas; Kallas did not make it, but Federley was elected vice president under the new president Hans van Baalen.

In addition to his committee assignments, Federley is a member of the European Parliament Intergroup on Integrity (Transparency, Anti-Corruption and Organized Crime).

Second mandate in the European Parliament 2019–2020
In the 2019 European Parliament election Fredrick Federley was re-elected for a second term. After the election the ALDE-group reformed and created the new Renew Europe group. Fredrick Federley ran for president of the group against, amongst others, Dacian Cioloș and Sophie in 't Veld but dropped out of the race after it was clear that Cioloș had secured enough votes to win. He was subsequently appointed Vice president of the group and in November 2019 he was appointed to Chair of the Renew Europe working group for Sustainability and structural policies, the working group that handles the majority of EU spending.  

He has taken seats as ordinary member of the Committee on the Environment, Public Health and Food Safety (ENVI) and is a substitute member of the Committee on Agriculture and Rural Development (AGRI).

Resignation
On 11 December 2020, Federley resigned from all politics immediately, after it became known he had been in a relationship during 2020 with a convicted child rapist. Politician Emma Wiesner was announced as Federleys replacement in the European Parliament the same day.

Political positions
When the Swedish Government announced that it intended to increase the penalty for purchasing sex from six months to one year's imprisonment, effective 1 July 2011,
and debated and voted on this on 12 May 2011, the vote was: For 282, Against 1.
The sole opponent was Federley, however he claimed that attempts were made to prevent him from speaking against the proposal by the Centre Party.

In 2017, Federley was instrumental in blocking Five Star Movement from joining the ALDE group, which was widely interpreted as a first sign of organized rebellion against group leader Guy Verhofstadt.

References

External links 
 www.federley.se , official website
 federley.blogspot.com, primary (political) blog
 Federleys andra sida, secondary (more personal) blog

1978 births
Centre Party (Sweden) MEPs
Gay politicians
LGBT members of the European Parliament
Swedish LGBT politicians
Living people
Male bloggers
Members of the Riksdag
MEPs for Sweden 2014–2019
MEPs for Sweden 2019–2024
Örebro University alumni
Swedish bloggers